Ilkadim is a district with in Samsun Province located on the coast of Black Sea. The district has an altitude of 5 meters and an area of 152.28 km². It is also the most populous district of Black Sea Region, with a total population of 336,501 people. The majority of the urbanized portion of Samsun City is located within Ilkadim.

Ilkadim is bordered by Canik county to the east, the Black Sea in the north, Atakum county to the west, and Kavak county to the south.

Geography 

The district includes the port of the Samsun. The name İlkadım refers to Atatürk's arrival in Samsun via sea in the ship the Bandirma in order to start the Turkish War of Independence on 19 May 1919. (İlkadım means first step). The population of İlkadım was 307,746 as of 2009 and grew to 340,421 by 2021. There are 61 neighborhoods in total in the district. The five largest neighborhoods in the district are respectively; Fevzi Çakmak, Kazım Karabekir, Adalet, Bahçelievler, and Kadıköy, and these five neighborhoods with a total population of 79,936 make up about a quarter of the district's population. In 2009, Ilkadim constituted 59% of the population of Greater Samsun, that figure declined to 47% by 2020 as a result of the expansion of suburban districts in Samsun.

History 
 Excavations have been carried out on the höyük of Dündartepe revealed a settlement of Chalcolithic age. During the early Hellenistic age there was a colony named Amisos (in Greek Αμισός) founded by the colonialists from Miletus. The colony was captured by Julius Caesar of Roman Empire in 43 BC. After 1071, the city was captured by Danishmends  and Seljuks. In 1413 was incorporated into Ottoman Empire by Mehmet I.

İlkadım is a part of the Samsun Metropolitan Municipality. In 1994 it was declared a municipality within the city borders of the Samsun Metropolitan Municipality. With the growth of the region, commercial activities in the center have declined and much of the middle class of Samsun has moved to newer and more modern neighborhoods. Efforts have been made to revitalize İlkadım like the construction of the Sheraton Hotel Samsun, Piazza Samsun and the reconstruction of Samsun Saathane Square and Republic Square (Samsun). The district is also served by extensive public transit including the Samsun Tram.

Climate 
The prevailing winds in the district generally differ according to the seasons. In Summer, a local high pressure center occurs in the Black Sea Region which meets a local low pressure center that originates in Anatolia. Therefore, winds flowing from the Black Sea towards these Anatolian winds create north-east and north-west winds. In winter, the district is influenced by temporary low pressure centers. Dry and hot winds blowing from the southwest and south in the district reduce the humidity in the district creating a pleasant atmosphere.

The average relative humidity of the district is 73%. This figure reaches 77-79% on average in April and May. In December, humidity on average drops to 70%. The absolute humidity of the district is on average 5.0 grams per year. Since absolute humidity is directly proportional to temperature, it tends to be most humid in Summer.

November is the rainiest month and May the driest month in Ilkadim. The annual average precipitation is around 700 mm. The number of rainy days is an average of 100 days per year.

History 

Ilkadim Municipality was established in 1994 as a subordinate municipality when the Samsun Metropolitan Municipality was established by the national government in Ankara. However, with a law in 2008, it became one of the 4 central districts of Samsun by including the lower level municipalities of Gazi and Yeşilkent. Currently, it is the largest and most developed district of Samsun and the Black Sea Region in terms of population.
On May 19, 1919 Atatürk, the district was named Ilkadım because he came to Samsun and took the first step towards independence here.

Population 
In 2008, İlkadım had a population of 303,202, that figure grew to 340,421 by 2020. The population of the district is 49.37% male and 50.63% female. Despite continued population growth, the figure has been shadowed by the growth of neighboring districts like Atakum.

Rural area
There are 11 villages in the rural area of İlkadım. The total population of the district is (urban and rural) 315,089

Government and politics
The mayor is Necattin Demirtaş (Good Party). The Mayor of the Samsun Metropolitan Municipality is Mustafa Demir and the Governor of Samsun Province is Zülkif Dağlı. İlkadım is a traditionally politically conservative district.

See also
 Surgical Instruments and Health Museum
 Statue of Honor, the landmark of Samsun
 Samsun Saathane Square, Samsun's Historic Square
 Samsun Clock Tower, Samsun's Clock Tower
 Piazza Samsun, the largest mall in the Central Black Sea Region

References